Earl Hall is a building on the campus of Columbia University. Built in 1900–1902 and designed by McKim, Mead & White, the building serves as a center for student religious life. It was listed on the National Register of Historic Places in 2018 for its historic role in serving as a venue for meetings and dances of the Columbia Student Homophile League, the oldest LGBTQ student organization in the United States.

References 

Columbia University campus
School buildings on the National Register of Historic Places in Manhattan
School buildings completed in 1902
McKim, Mead & White buildings
1902 establishments in New York City